A62 or A-62 may refer to:
 A62 road (England), a road connecting Manchester and Leeds
 A62 motorway (France), a road connecting Toulouse and Bordeaux
 A62 motorway (Germany), a road connecting the A1 with the A6
 A62 motorway (Spain), a road connecting the Portuguese Border and Burgos
 Benoni Defense, in the Encyclopaedia of Chess Openings
 London Underground A62 Stock, rolling stock used on the Metropolitan and East London lines on the London Underground